Başka 33/3  (Different) is Işın Karaca's third solo album. Başka 33/3 was released on 19 June 2006. In this album, she has written "Herşeye Rağmen" with Erdem Yörük.

The name of the album on the cover is stylized as "Başka" to highlight the word "aşk", which means "love" in Turkish.

The first video for the album is shot for "Mandalinalar", directed by Kubilay Kasap. The second video came to "Kalp Tanrıya Emanet". Third video is an Onur Mete song "Bırakma".

Track listing

[1]:Tracks 12–32 are silence.

Personnel
Cem Erman – Percussion
Eylem Pelit – Bass
Erdem Sökmen – Classic & Acoustic Guitar
Gültekin Kaçar – Electrical Guitar
Ant Şimşek – Electrical Guitar
Erdem Yörük – Piano
Gürkan Çakmak – Whistle
Volkan Öktem – Drum
Ali Yılmaz – Cümbüş & Tarcüş #
Volkan Akyüz – Side Flute
Gündem – Yaylı Sazlar #
Timur atasever – Cello
Kadir Okyay – Violin
İlyas Tetik – Lute
Mehmet Akatay & Cengiz Ercümer – Vurmalı Sazlar #
Mehmet Akatay – Percussion Vocal
Zara – Solo Vocal

Back Vocals: Işın Karaca, Selçuk Suna, Gaye Biçer, Jale Kök, Yonca Karadağ, Murat Çekem, Ekrem Düzgünoğlu & Bahadır Sağbaş (3)
# Turkish Translation

Credits
Production: Seyhan Müzik
Producer: Bülent Seyhan
Producers: Işın Karaca, Akın Büyükkaraca, Erdem Yörük
Musical Director: Erdem Yörük
Production: Akın Büyükkaraca – Akış Prodüksiyon
Coordinators: Hakan Kasapoğlu, Seyfi Yerlikaya
Studio: MDM Studios
Record & Edit: Aykut Şahlanan
Drum Edits: Murat Bulut
Mix: Serkan Kula
Mastering: Ulaş Ağca (İmaj)
Photographs: Zeynel Abidin
Hair: Mehmet Emir & Turan Çakar (Select Kuför)
Make-up: Hande Kılıç
Costume: Songül Sarpbaş
Graphics: Ozan Karakoç
Press: FRS

Music videos

 Bırakma

Song samples

References

External links
 

2006 albums
Işın Karaca albums